Appa (English: Father) is a Nepali-language film written and directed by Anmol Gurung and produced by Ruden Sada Lepcha. The film features Dayahang Rai, Siddhant Raj Tamang and Allona Kabo Lepcha. The film was released on 28 June 2019 in Nepal and on 5 July 2019 in India.

Cast
 Dayahang Rai as Birkhe/Appa
 Siddhant Raj Tamang as Sid
 Allona Kabo Lepcha as Kavya

Production
The shooting of the film began on 25 April 2018 at the historic Ghoom Railway Station in Darjeeling, while portions of the movie were shot in places like Sandakphu and Kalimpong.

Reception

Diwakar Pyakurel writes in OnlineKhabar  that "the uniqueness of the setting is not the only strength of the movie. It presents a complex social drama on the universal theme of parental love beyond blood, but the narrative flow is so smooth and comprehensive that the audience easily understands the message" and gave it a rating of 3 out of 5. Rupak Risal of Moviemandu commended the "other love story [of the teenagers] within, good cinematography work and performances of the young actors" in the film but wrote what the film "lacks the most as a love story and drama is its scope. It doesn’t want to explore human hearts and excavate to the core to explore the human nature" and gave the film a rating of 2.5 out of 5. Gokarna Gautam of Nepal wrote that the film makes a honest attempt to explore the father-son relationship but does not reach the emotional depths required. The songs of the film are good but the plot is weak and gave the film a rating of 2 out of 5.

Soundtrack

References

2019 films
Nepalese drama films
2010s Nepali-language films